Route 66 Steak 'n Shake, also known as the St. Louis Street Steak In Shake, is a historic Steak 'n Shake restaurant located at Springfield, Missouri, United States, that is listed on the National Register of Historic Places (NRHP).

Description
The restaurant was built in 1962 along former U.S. Highway 66, and is a one-story, rectangular plan, concrete building with a flat roof.  It is faced with glazed ceramic tiles and sits on a poured concrete foundation.  Also on the property are two free-standing original signs.

It was listed on the National Register of Historic Places in 2012.

See also

 National Register of Historic Places listings in Greene County, Missouri

References

External links

Commercial buildings on the National Register of Historic Places in Missouri
Commercial buildings completed in 1962
Buildings and structures in Springfield, Missouri
National Register of Historic Places in Greene County, Missouri